The Treason (Ireland) Act 1821 (1 & 2 Geo 4 c 24) is an Act of the Parliament of the United Kingdom. It extended most of the English Treason Act 1695 to Ireland. Previously the 1695 Act only applied to England and Scotland (having been extended to Scotland in 1708).

The whole Act was repealed for the Republic of Ireland by the Statute Law Revision Act 1983.

Section 1

As originally enacted, section 1 extended sections 2 to 5 of the Treason Act 1695 to Ireland. All but section 5 of the 1695 Act were repealed by the Treason Act 1945. Therefore, today the effect of section 1 is only to extend section 5 of the Treason Act 1695 to Northern Ireland. Section 5 imposes a  three-year time limit on bringing prosecutions for treason.

Section 2
This section stated that the above time limit did not apply to attempts on the life of the king, or to misprision of such treason. (Similar provision had been made in section 6 of the 1695 Act.) Section 2 also stated that trials for such treason or misprision were to be conducted according to the rules of evidence and procedure applicable in ordinary murder trials, which were different from the rules for treason trials. (This rule had been introduced in Great Britain by the Treason Act 1800.)

Section 2 was repealed by the Treason Act 1945.

See also
Treason Act (Ireland) 1765
Treason (Ireland) Act 1854
Treason Act

References and notes
The Statutes Revised. Third Edition. HMSO. 1950. Volume 2. Pages ccxxv and 770.
John Raithby. The Statutes of the United Kingdom of Great Britain and Ireland. King's Printers. London. 1822. Volume 8. Pages 318 and 319. Digitised copy from Google Books.

External links
The Treason (Ireland) Act 1821, as amended from the National Archives.
List of repeals in the Republic of Ireland from the Irish Statute Book.

United Kingdom Acts of Parliament 1821
Acts of the Parliament of the United Kingdom concerning Ireland
1821 in Ireland